Larry Smith is a British cinematographer.  Born in London, he is known for his work with Stanley Kubrick, Tom Hooper and Nicolas Winding Refn.

Smith had his directing debut with the 2015 film Trafficker.

Filmography

Film

Television

References

External links
 

British cinematographers
Artists from London
Living people
Year of birth missing (living people)